Vandenberg Space Force Base Launch Facility 04 (LC-04) is a former United States Air Force (USAF) Intercontinental ballistic missile (ICBM) launch facility on Vandenberg Space Force Base, California, USA.  It is a launch site for the land-based LGM-30 Minuteman missile series.

External links

Vandenberg Space Force Base